Bijan Bijani (born May 24, 1953) is an Iranian singer and calligrapher. His most famous work is the song "The Concealment of the Heart".

Biography 
Bijan Bijani was born on May 24, 1953 in Babol. He began learning calligraphy and singing in high school, and as he became acquainted with the Kamkar family, Bijani became more familiar with music. The result of this acquaintance was his first album entitled "The Legend of My Fatherland" composed by Arsalan Kamkar and performed by the Tehran Symphony Orchestra. In 1397, he published a collection of his calligraphic works in a cat called Nay and Ney. He learned to play the Setar instrument from Dariush Pirniakan and Ata Janguk.

Music albums 

 The Legend of My Fatherland - Composer: Arsalan Kamkar
 Hidden Heart - Composer: Kambiz Roshanravan
 Mirror in the Mirror - Composer: Kambiz Roshanravan
 Alley - Composer: Ismail Vaseghi
 Gol Be Daman - Composer: Pashang Kamkar
 Colorful Dream - Composer: Mohammad Sarir
 Red Apple of the Sun - Composer: Kambiz Roshanravan
 Poet's Voice - Composer: Kambiz Roshanravan
 Iran Zamin - Composer: Kambiz Roshanravan
 Four Seasons - Composer: Ismail Tehrani
 Mojdeh Baran - Composer: Kambiz Roshanravan
 Aftab Khooban - Composer: Ismail Vaseghi
 Another letter - Composer: Mohammad Javad Zarabian
 Niloufar Nilofaran - Composer: Ali Akbarpour

References 

Living people
1953 births
20th-century Iranian male singers
Iranian male singers